The 1935 George Washington Colonials football team was an American football team that represented George Washington University as an independent during the 1935 college football season. In its seventh season under head coach Jim Pixlee, the team compiled a 6–3 record and outscored opponents by a total of 141 to 101. The team defeated North Dakota, West Virginia, and Tulsa, and lost to Alabama, Wake Forest, and Rice.

Schedule

References

George Washington
George Washington Colonials football seasons
George Washington Colonials football